Howard Riley may refer to:
 Howard Riley (musician) (born 1943), English jazz pianist and composer
 Howard Riley (footballer) (born 1938), former English footballer
 Howard W. Riley (1879–1971), professor of agricultural engineering at Cornell University